Yanpu Township is a rural township in Pingtung County, Taiwan.

Geography

 Population: 24,208 (February 2023)
 Area:

Administrative divisions
The township comprises 12 villages: Gaolang, Jiuai, Luoyang, Pengcuo, Shirong, Xiner, Xinwei, Yanbei, Yannan, Yanzhong, Yonglong and Zhenxing.

Education
 Tajen University

References

External links 

 Yenpu Township Office website 
 

Townships in Pingtung County